Stanin  is a village in Łuków County, Lublin Voivodeship, in eastern Poland. It is the seat of the gmina (administrative district) called Gmina Stanin.

References

Villages in Łuków County
Lesser Poland
Lublin Voivodeship (1474–1795)
Siedlce Governorate
Lublin Governorate
Lublin Voivodeship (1919–1939)